On February 2, 2021, a shootout occurred between a gunman and several agents with the Federal Bureau of Investigation (FBI) at an apartment complex in Sunrise, Florida, United States. At the time, the agents were serving a warrant related to a child pornography case. Two FBI agents were fatally shot and three others were injured. The gunman, who was the subject of the warrant, was later found dead after barricading himself inside the apartment. The incident was one of the deadliest in the FBI's history.

Shootout
At 6:04 a.m., FBI agents investigating a child exploitation case served a federal warrant at the Water Terrace apartment complex, located in an upscale gated community in Sunrise,  outside of Fort Lauderdale. They were seeking a computer and other evidence for the case. The agents were being backed up by officers with the Sunrise Police Department. As the agents were about to execute the warrant, the subject of their warrant, who had reportedly seen them coming through a doorbell camera, began firing at them with a rifle. Five agents were struck, two of them fatally, prompting a massive law enforcement response, including the SWAT team from the Broward County Sheriff's Office. One of the fatally wounded agents, Daniel Alfin, managed to return fire, despite being shot multiple times. The other deceased agent, Laura Schwartzenberger, was killed instantly. The gunman, who was wounded in the exchange, then barricaded himself inside the home for several hours and was later found dead from a self-inflicted gunshot wound. Witnesses calling 9-1-1 reported hearing multiple gunshots in the apartment complex.

The shootout was the most violent incident in the FBI's history since the 1986 Miami shootout that left two agents dead and five others injured, and it was also the first time an agent was fatally shot in the line of duty since 2008.

Victims
Two FBI agents were killed in the shootout and three others were injured. Those killed were Special Agent Daniel Alfin, 36, and Special Agent Laura Schwartzenberger, 43. Schwartzenberger had been with the FBI since 2005, and Alfin since 2009. Both of them specialized in crimes against children. Two of the injured agents, both of whom suffered multiple gunshot wounds, were in stable condition at a hospital and eventually released, while the third did not require hospitalization and was treated at the scene.

Perpetrator

The gunman, 55-year-old David Lee Huber, was also identified as the subject in the federal warrant. The FBI and investigators said he was being investigated for possession of child pornography. A Sunrise Police spokeswoman said the department hadn't had any prior dealings with Huber, nor were they aware of any prior concern that he was armed. The department later said they had been called to his apartment three times in April 2020, twice in one day because of noise and nuisance complaints, and the third time for a "medical run". His only interactions with law enforcement were through a series of traffic tickets and an eviction in Colorado.

Huber was born and raised in Louisiana and lived in South Florida for most of his life. He had previously lived in New York, Colorado, and Atlanta for portions of his life. He married in late 2000 and had two children, but he divorced in 2016. Huber attended an unspecified college in Broward County, according to an online resume he wrote. He ran a computer troubleshooting company with his then-wife from 2004 to around 2006, then a computer consultation company from 2006 to 2011. From 2013 to 2020, he worked a series of computer-related jobs. He was also a former mortgage broker. A neighbor described Huber as an awkward, antisocial man who lived alone and with little furniture. He had been living in Pembroke Pines before the shooting.

A former coworker said Huber told him that he was suffering from bipolar disorder that he was taking medication for. The coworker also said Huber had been fired from his job as a systems analyst after ranting against President Donald Trump taking away his medical coverage during a company discussion on healthcare. Following the incident, employees were concerned about Huber returning and committing a workplace shooting in retaliation, which led to the company organizing escorts and allowing some employees to bring their firearms into the office.

Reactions
President Joe Biden reacted to the shootout, saying his "heart aches" for the deceased agents. FBI Director Christopher A. Wray praised the two deceased agents in a statement and also said the FBI "will be forever grateful for their bravery." The FBI Agents Association offered condolences to the injured and said the two agents' deaths were "devastating to the entire FBI community and to our country."

References

2021 in Florida
2021 mass shootings in the United States
2021 murders in the United States
2020s crimes in Florida
Deaths by firearm in Florida
February 2021 crimes in the United States
February 2021 events in the United States
Federal Bureau of Investigation
Law enforcement operations in the United States
Mass shootings in Florida
Mass shootings in the United States
Murder in Florida
2021 shootout